Baldassare or Baldasarre d'Anna ( – after 1639) was an Italian painter of the late-Renaissance period.

Biography
Born in Venice to a Flemish family, and trained with Leonardo Corona. The date of his death is uncertain, but he seems to have been alive in 1639.  For a number of years he studied under Corona, and on the death of that painter completed several works left unfinished by him. His own activity seems to have been confined to the production of pieces for several of the churches and a few private houses in Venice, and the old guide-books and descriptions of the city notice a considerable number of paintings by him. Scarcely any have survived.

Notes

References
 

Attribution:

External links

16th-century Italian painters
Italian male painters
17th-century Italian painters
Painters from Venice
Italian Renaissance painters
Year of birth uncertain